Jean is a common female given name in English-speaking countries. It is the Scottish form of Jane (and is sometimes pronounced that way). It is sometimes spelled Jeaine. It is the equivalent of Johanna, Joanna, Joanne, Jeanne, Jana, and Joan, and derives from the Old French Jehanne, which is derived from the Latin name Johannes, itself from the Koine Greek name Ioannes (Ιωαννης), ultimately from the Biblical Hebrew name Yochanan (יוֹחָנָן), a short form of the name Yehochanan (יְהוֹחָנָן), meaning "YHWH/Yahweh is Gracious". 

Famous people with the given name Jean:

Notable people 
Jean Acker (1893–1978), American silent film actress
Jean Adam (1704–1765), Scottish poet and songwriter
Jean Adamson (born 1928), English children's writer and illustrator
Jean Alexander (1926–2016), English television actress
Jean Anderson (1907–2001), English actress
Jean Appleton (1911–2003), Australian painter, art teacher and printmaker
Jean Arthur (1900–1991), American actress
Jean M. Auel (born 1936), American writer
Jean Bartik (1924–2011), American computer programmer
Jean Batten (1909–1982), New Zealand aviator
Jean Boht (born 1932), English actress
Jean Briggs Watters (1925–2018), English cryptanalyst
Jean Byron (1925–2006), American actress
Jean Carn (born 1947), American jazz and pop singer
Jean Carroll (1911–2010), American actress and comedian 
Jean Carroll (born 1980), Irish cricketer
E. Jean Carroll (born 1943), American journalist and advice columnist
Jean Clemens (1880–1909), youngest daughter of writer Mark Twain
Jean Colin (1905–1989), English actress
Jean Conan Doyle (1912–1997), British Air Commandant
Jean Coulthard (1908–2000), Canadian composer
Jean Danker (born 1978), Singaporean DJ, voiceover artist and actress
Jean Darling (1922–2015), American child actress 
Jean Dunbabin (born 1939), British historian
Jean Donovan (1953–1980), American lay missionary who was murdered in El Salvador
Jean Else (born 1951), disgraced British educator and the first person to have a Damehood revoked
Jean Erdman (born 1916), American dancer and choreographer
Jean Fergusson (1944–2019), British television and theatre actress
Jean Fuller (born 1950), American politician
Jean Garcia (born 1969), Filipino actress
Jean Craighead George (1919–2012), American author
Jean D'Costa (born 1937), Jamaican children's novelist
Jean Grae (born 1976), American hip hop artist
Jean Gordon, Countess of Bothwell (1546–1629), Scottish noblewoman 
Jean Brooks Greenleaf (1832–1918), American woman suffragist
Jean Hagen (1923–1977), American actress
Jean Harlow (1911–1937), American actress
Jean Hartley (1933–2011), English autobiographer and publisher
Jean Hepburn (died 1599), Scottish noblewoman
Jean Horsley (1913–1997), New Zealand artist
Jean Houston (born 1937), American author
Jean Ingelow (1820–1897), an English poet and novelist
Nikki Jean (born Nicholle Jean Leary) (born 1983), American singer-songwriter
Jean Kerr (1922–2003), American author and playwright
Jean Kent (1921−2013), British actress 
Jean Knight (born 1943), American soul/R&B/funk singer
Jean Liedloff (1926–2011), American author
Jean Madeira (1918–1972), American mezzo-soprano
Jean Marsh (born 1934), English actress and screenwriter
Jean Muir (1928–1995), English fashion designer
Jean Olson Lanjouw (1962–2005), American economist
Jean Parker (1915–2005), American actress
Jean Passanante (born 1953), American television screenwriter 
Jean Peters (1926–2000), American actress
Jean Prahm (born 1978), American bobsledder
Jean Rabe (born 1957), American fantasy and sci-fi author and editor
Jean Redpath (1937–2014), Scottish folk singer
Jean Rhodes, American academic psychologist and author 
Jean Rhys (1890–1979), Dominican novelist
Jean Ritchie (1922–2015), American folk singer and songwriter
Jean Rogers (1916–1991), American actress
Jean Sagal (born 1961), American television actress and director
Jean Saunders (1932–2011), British writer of romance novels
Jean Schmidt (born 1951), American politician
Jean Seberg (1938–1979), American actress
Jean Shafiroff (1933–2016), American philanthropist and socialite
Jean Shepard (1933–2016), American honky tonk singer-songwriter
Jean Shrimpton (born 1942), English model and actress
Jean Simmons (1929–2010), English actress
Jean Smart (born 1951), American actress
Jean Kennedy Smith (born 1928), American diplomat
Jean Gurney Fine Spahr (1861-1935), American social reformer
Jean Stafford (1915–1979), American short story writer and novelist
Jean Stapleton (1923–2013), American actress
Jean Stewart, several people
Jean Terrell (born 1944), American R&B and jazz singer
Jean Valentine (born 1934), American poet
Jean Vander Pyl (1919–1999), American actress
Jean Webster, pseudonym for Alice Jane Chandler Webster (1876–1916), an American writer 
Jean Westwood (born 1931), British ice dancer
Jean Westwood (1923–1997), a political figure born in Utah
Jean Willes (1923–1989), American film actress
Jean R. Yawkey (1909–1992), the wife of Tom Yawkey and owner of the Boston Red Sox

Fictional characters
Jean,  in the British sitcom dinnerladies
Jean Brodie,  in the novella and film The Prime of Miss Jean Brodie
Jean DeWolff,  in the comic Spider-Man
Jean Louise "Scout" Finch, narrator of the novel To Kill a Mockingbird
Jean Grey, in Marvel comics. An omega-level mutant with extremely powerful empathic, telepathic and telekinetic abilities. She is host of the almighty Phoenix Force entity 
Jean Randolph, an alternate personality of  Victoria Lord on the American soap opera One Life to Live
Jean Warboys,  in the British sitcom One Foot in the Grave
Jean Hawkins, the deceased wife of Robert Hawkins and late mother of Sharon and Virgil in Static Shock
Jean Nesbitt, sister of the protagonist from the TV sitcom Barbara, portrayed by Sherrie Hewson
Jean Slater, in the TV soap opera EastEnders, portrayed by Gillian Wright
Jean Abbott, wife of Sid James's character in the TV sitcom Bless This House, portrayed by Diana Coupland
Jean Gunnhildr, a playable Anemo character in the video game Genshin Impact

See also 
 Gene Tierney (1920–1991), an American film and stage actress

English feminine given names
English given names
Given names
Scottish feminine given names